Kalateh-ye Gah (also Romanized as Kalāteh-ye Gāh) is a village in Baq Mej Rural District, in the Central District of Chenaran County, Razavi Khorasan Province, Iran. At the 2006 census, its population was 89, in 17 families.

References 

Populated places in Chenaran County